Jacopo Sciamanna (born 24 May 1990) is an Italian footballer who currently plays as a striker for Monterosi.

Club career
Having come through the youth system of Lazio, Sciamanna was sent on loan to San Marino Calcio in 2010 without having played a senior game for his parent club.

On 24 August 2018, he joined Cavese.

On 13 July 2019 he signed with Serie D side Monterosi.

References

External links
 

1990 births
People from Viterbo
Living people
Italian footballers
Association football midfielders
S.S. Lazio players
A.S.D. Victor San Marino players
Celano F.C. Marsica players
A.S. Gubbio 1910 players
S.S.D. Correggese Calcio 1948 players
Cavese 1919 players
Reggina 1914 players
Serie C players
Serie D players
Footballers from Lazio
Sportspeople from the Province of Viterbo